The IEEE Annals of the History of Computing is a quarterly peer-reviewed academic journal published by the IEEE Computer Society. It covers the history of computing, computer science, and computer hardware. It was founded in 1979 by the AFIPS, in particular by Saul Rosen, who was an editor until his death in 1991.

The journal publishes scholarly articles, interviews, "think pieces," and memoirs by computer pioneers, and news and events in the field. It was established in July 1979 as Annals of the History of Computing, with Bernard Galler as editor-in-chief. The journal became an IEEE publication in 1992, and was retitled to IEEE Annals of the History of Computing. The 2020 impact factor was 0.741. The current editor in chief is Gerardo Con Diaz with the University of California, Davis.

See also
 Technology and Culture
 Information & Culture
 Computer History Museum
 Charles Babbage Institute

References

External links
 

Annals of the History of Computing
Computer science journals
History of computing
Quarterly journals
Publications established in 1979
English-language journals